Chakpikarong  is a town and subdivision of Chandel district of Manipur state in northeastern India. The Anaal tribe is the majority in this region. Its history is deeply rooted with the history of the state. The literacy rate have boomed up in the recent years as transportation have developed.

Description
The place is inhabited by Anāl Naga tribe since time immemorial. Tuingan and Chapki river meet here.

Languages
Anaal, a Sino-Tibetan language, is spoken here. A total of 140,000 residents of India speak the language, and more people in Myanmar also speak it.

References

External links
 Official government website

Districts of Manipur
 
Minority Concentrated Districts in India
1974 establishments in Manipur